Adult Contemporary is a chart published by Billboard ranking the top-performing songs in the United States in the adult contemporary music (AC) market.  In 1999, six different songs topped the chart in 52 issues of the magazine, based on weekly airplay data from radio stations compiled by Nielsen Broadcast Data Systems.

In the first fifty weeks of the year, only four songs held the number one position on the AC chart.  In the first issue of Billboard of 1999, "I'm Your Angel", a collaboration between singers R. Kelly and Celine Dion, was in its fourth week at number one.  It held the top spot for the first nine weeks of the year to finish with a total of twelve consecutive weeks atop the chart.  It was the only AC number one of the year to also top Billboards all-genre listing, the Hot 100.  In the issue dated March 6, the track was displaced from the top of the AC chart by "Angel" by Canadian singer Sarah McLachlan, which also spent twelve consecutive weeks at number one. McLachlan's song was replaced at number one in the issue dated May 29 by "You'll Be in My Heart" by British singer Phil Collins.  Taken from the soundtrack of the Disney film Tarzan, for which Collins wrote several songs, the track spent 19 non-consecutive weeks at number one, tying the record for the highest number of weeks atop the AC chart by a song, set three years earlier by Celine Dion's "Because You Loved Me".  Collins also won both the Golden Globe Award for Best Original Song and the Academy Award for Best Song for "You'll Be in My Heart".  The 19 weeks which the song spent atop the AC chart consisted of four separate runs, all of which were ended by "I Want It That Way" by Backstreet Boys, which ultimately spent a total of 10 weeks at number one.

In the penultimate issue of Billboard of the year, Celine Dion returned to number one with "That's the Way It Is", making her the only artist to achieve two number ones in 1999.  The song was not at the time available to the public to purchase as a physical single, but was serviced to radio and achieved sufficient spins to top the AC chart, which is based solely on airplay.  "That's the Way It Is" was Dion's final number one before she took a hiatus from the music business, during which she gave birth to her first child.  A week later, "I Knew I Loved You" by Savage Garden moved into the number one position, the start of a run in the top spot which would ultimately last for 17 weeks.  The track would prove to be one of the most enduring songs in the history of AC radio, and in 2002 it set a new record for the highest total number of weeks spent on Billboards Adult Contemporary chart when it spent its 124th week on the listing, breaking the record set by one of Savage Garden's earlier songs, "Truly Madly Deeply".

Chart history

References

See also
1999 in music
List of artists who reached number one on the U.S. Adult Contemporary chart

1999
1999 record charts
1999 in American music